Vasil Georgiev Bozhikov (born 2 June 1988) is a Bulgarian professional footballer who captained his latest club - Fortuna Liga club Slovan Bratislava and plays for the Bulgarian national team. He usually plays as a centre back.

Bozhikov began his senior career with Third League club Gigant Saedinenie, spending two and a half seasons before signed his first professional contract with First League club Minyor Pernik in February 2009. After three years with Minyor, he joined Litex Lovech in January 2012. Bozhikov made over 100 appearances for Litex and signed for Turkish Süper Lig club Kasımpaşa in July 2015. After two seasons with Kasımpaşa, he signed for Slovan Bratislava on a free transfer in July 2017.

In 2016, Bozhikov won his first cap for Bulgaria, having previously played for the under-21 team. Since his senior international debut, he has made over 20 appearances for the national team.

Career

Early career
Bozhikov was born in Gotse Delchev. He began playing football with hometown club Pirin Gotse Delchev, where he spent one year. Then he played youth football with Botev Plovdiv and Botev 2002.

In 2006, Bozhikov joined Gigant Saedinenie, where he made his senior debut in the Third League. For two-and-a-half seasons he made over 80 appearances for Gigant.

Minyor Pernik
In February 2009, Bozhikov signed professional contract with First League side Minyor Pernik after a successful trial period. He made his league debut on 16 March 2009 in a 0–0 home draw against Litex Lovech. At the end of July 2011, Bozhikov spent a week on trial with Belgian side Genk, playing in a pre-season match against Bayer 04 Leverkusen, but he did not sign for Genk. During his spell at Pernik, Bozhikov made a total of 70 league appearances for the club.

Litex Lovech
On 1 December 2011, it was announced that Litex Lovech had agreed a deal with Minyor to sign Bozhikov; Minyor announced that the contract would begin on 1 January 2012. Bozhikov was given the number 4 shirt and signed a three-year contract. He made his debut on 22 April 2012 in a 1–1 away draw against Ludogorets Razgrad, playing full 90 minutes.

Bozhikov became a regular in the team during a 2012–13 season, making 26 league starts. In 2013–14 season, he scored his first goal for Litex in a 2–1 away win over Sozopol in the Bulgarian Cup on 6 November 2013.

In January 2015, Bozhikov signed a new contract with Litex, keeping him at the club until 2018. On 2 July 2015, he scored his first ever European goal in a 1–1 away draw against FK Jelgava in the first qualifying round of 2015–16 UEFA Europa League.

Kasımpaşa
Bozhikov signed with Turkish side Kasımpaşa on 15 July 2015 on a 2+1-year deal for a reported fee of €400,000. He made his debut for the club on 23 September against Tire 1922 in the Turkish Cup, playing full 90 minutes. He played his first Süper Lig game on 28 September, coming on as a first-half substitute for Kenneth Omeruo in a 1–1 home draw against Rizespor. On 4 October, Bozhikov made his first league start in Kasımpaşa's fixture away at Antalyaspor.

Slovan Bratislava
On 30 July 2017, Bozhikov signed for Slovak Super Liga club Slovan Bratislava on a three-year contract. He was given the number 29 shirt. He made his debut on 13 August, in a 1–1 home draw against DAC Dunajská Streda. On 1 May 2018, Bozhikov scored his first goal for Slovan in a 3–1 home win over Ružomberok in the Slovak Cup. He scored his first league goal against DAC at MOL Aréna on 12 May 2018, a goal which proved to be the winner.

Following the departure of Boris Sekulić in June 2018, Bozhikov was made captain of Slovan. On 29 July 2018, he scored his first goal of the 2018–19 season in a 3–0 win against Podbrezová. On 9 August, he scored his second goal of the season in a 2–1 win over Rapid Wien in the third qualifying round of 2018–19 UEFA Europa League.

International career
In February 2014, Bozhikov was named in the senior Bulgarian squad for the first time, ahead of a friendly against Belarus in March, but did not feature.

In March 2016, he was called up for friendly matches against Portugal and against Macedonia, and made his senior debut from the bench on 26 March, in a 1–0 away win over Portugal, replacing Strahil Popov in the 88th minute. On 29 March, Bozhikov made his first Bulgaria start in a friendly against Macedonia at Philip II Arena.

Bozhikov scored his first goal for Bulgaria on 25 March 2019, when he headed from a corner kick in a 1–1 draw against Kosovo in a UEFA Euro 2020 qualifying match.

Career statistics

Club

National team

International goals
Scores and results list Bulgaria's goal tally first.

Honours
Slovan Bratislava
Fortuna Liga (4): 2018–19, 2019–20, 2020–21, 2021–22
Slovnaft Cup (3): 2017–18, 2019–20, 2020–21

'Individual'
Bulgarian Footballer of the Year Third place: 2019

References

External links
 
 
 Footmercato profile 

1988 births
Living people
Bulgarian footballers
Association football defenders
Bulgaria under-21 international footballers
Bulgaria international footballers
PFC Minyor Pernik players
PFC Litex Lovech players
Kasımpaşa S.K. footballers
ŠK Slovan Bratislava players
First Professional Football League (Bulgaria) players
Süper Lig players
Slovak Super Liga players
Bulgarian expatriate footballers
Expatriate footballers in Turkey
Expatriate footballers in Slovakia
Bulgarian expatriate sportspeople in Turkey
Bulgarian expatriate sportspeople in Slovakia